Gustaf Elis Fischer RVO RNO (13 January 1834 – 19 August 1889) was a Swedish lawyer, chief executive of Skandia (1870–1886) and politician who was Member of Parliament.
He is in particular known for the Fischer-trial, in which he was accused of fraud and sentenced to prison.

Early life

Childhood and family 
Gustaf Elis Fischer was born on 13 January 1834, in Askersund, Örebro, Sweden. His father was Per Gustaf Fischer, a postmaster, and his mother was Eva Sophia Fischer (née Brattström). Fischer had two younger full brothers, Emil Nicanor (1839–1912), and Alfred Theodor (1836–1839). His maternal grandfather, Magnus Brattström, was an ironmaster.

After his father's death 1845, Fischer moved along with his mother and brother Emil Nicanor to Örebro.

Education 
He attended Askersund Elementary School before graduating from Karolinska elementarläroverket in Örebro; he graduated in 1854. Fischer attended Uppsala University following his graduation, and passed the court exams in 1859.

Business and political career

Skandia 
In June 1870, Fischer was elected to serve as the chief executive manager of Skandia, a position previously held by Wilhelm Dufwa. He was then succeeded by Gustaf Lagerbring in 1886 after he had been accused of fraudulent acts.

Fischer-trial 
The Fischer-trial (Swedish: Fischerska målet) was a well-known lawsuit in which Elis Fischer was accused of fraud due to him not being able to separate his own finances from his own workplace finances. The fraud was mentioned in more than 208 newspaper articles in December 1886 after he had resigned on 8 December 1886. Fischer whom enjoyed a significant employment and an upper class income, surprised many of his fellows that he had committed a fraud. He was exposed when he had escaped the presentation of obligations he had received and sold. Fischer was on 5 January 1887, sentenced to prison at Långholmen Central Prison.

Politics 
In March 1886, Fischer became a member of the upper house of the Riksdag, representing the City of Stockholm, a position he held until he was accused of fraud in December 1886; he resigned from his political offices on 17 December 1886.

Other efforts 
Fischer was a pioneering member of the Insurance Organisation and the Fire Insurance Tariff Organisation. Moreover, was he the chairperson of Stockholms gasverksstyrelse, vice chairperson of Göta kanalverk and member of the Widow conservation.

Personal life 

In 1864, Fischer married Hildur Fredrika Abenius, daughter of Carl Fredrik Abenius, the circuit judge of the judicial district of Livgedinget. Fischer bought several properties in Edsby in the 1860s by a baron named De Geer. At this location; he ordered a castle-like building to be built, and construction broke ground in 1866.

Death 
On 19 August 1889, at Långholmen Central Prison in Stockholm, Fischer died from pneumonia dextra.

Appointments 

   Knight of the Order of the Polar Star.
   Knight of the Order of Vasa.

References 

People from Askersund Municipality
Burials at Norra begravningsplatsen
Independent politicians in Sweden
Swedish bankers
Swedish people of Finnish descent
Swedish people of Danish descent
1834 births
1889 deaths
Politicians from Stockholm
19th-century Swedish politicians
19th-century Swedish lawyers
Swedish fraudsters
Members of the Första kammaren
Swedish politicians convicted of crimes
Swedish people of German descent
Politicians convicted of fraud
Uppsala University alumni
19th-century Swedish landowners
Directors of Skandia
Swedish prisoners and detainees
Knights of the Order of Vasa
Knights of the Order of the Polar Star
Deaths from pneumonia in Sweden